Latin liturgical rites, or Western liturgical rites, is a large family of liturgical rites and uses of public worship employed by the Latin Church, the largest particular church sui iuris of the Catholic Church, that originated in Europe where the Latin language once dominated. Its language is now known as Ecclesiastical Latin. The most used rite is the Roman Rite.

The Latin rites were for many centuries no less numerous than the modern Eastern Catholic liturgical rites. The number of Latin rites and uses is now much reduced. In the aftermath of the Council of Trent, in 1568 and 1570 Pope Pius V suppressed the breviaries and missals that could not be shown to have an antiquity of at least two centuries in favor of the Roman Missal and Roman Breviary. Many local rites that remained legitimate even after this decree were abandoned voluntarily, especially in the 19th century, in favor of the Tridentine Mass and other Roman Rite rituals. In the second half of the 20th century, most of the religious orders that had a distinct liturgical rite chose to adopt in its place the Roman Rite as revised in accordance with the decrees of the Second Vatican Council (see Mass of Paul VI). A few such liturgical rites persist today for the celebration of Mass, since 1965–1970 in revised forms, but the distinct liturgical rites for celebrating the other sacraments have been almost completely abandoned.

Liturgical rites currently in use within the Latin Church

Roman Rite

The Roman Rite is by far the most widely used. Like other liturgical rites, it developed over time, with newer forms replacing the older. It underwent many changes in the first millennium, during half of its existence (see Pre-Tridentine Mass). The forms that Pope Pius V, as requested by the Council of Trent, established in the 1560s and 1570s underwent repeated minor variations in the centuries immediately following. Each new typical edition (the edition to which other printings are to conform) of the Roman Missal (see Tridentine Mass) and of the other liturgical books superseded the previous one.

The 20th century saw more profound changes. Pope Pius X radically rearranged the Psalter of the Breviary and altered the rubrics of the Mass. Pope Pius XII significantly revised the Holy Week ceremonies and certain other aspects of the Roman Missal in 1955.

Ordinary Form

The Second Vatican Council (1962–1965) was followed by a general revision of the rites of all the Roman Rite sacraments, including the Eucharist. As before, each new typical edition of a liturgical book supersedes the previous one. Thus, the 1970 Roman Missal, which superseded the 1962 edition, was superseded by the edition of 1975. The 2002 edition in turn supersedes the 1975 edition both in Latin and, as official translations into each language appear, also in the vernacular languages. Under the terms of Summorum Pontificum by Pope Benedict XVI, the Mass of Paul VI, which followed Vatican II, is known as the Ordinary Form of the Roman Rite.

Extraordinary Form

The Tridentine Mass, as in the 1962 Roman Missal, and other pre-Vatican II rites are still authorized for use within the Roman Rite under the conditions indicated in the motu proprio Traditionis Custodes. These practices emanate from the liturgical reforms of the Council of Trent, from which the word "Tridentine" is derived. Following its description in Summorum Pontificum by Pope Benedict XVI, the ritual use of liturgical books promulgated before Vatican II is often referred to as the Extraordinary Form.

Anglican Use (Divine Worship)

The Anglican Use is a use of the Roman Rite, rather than a unique rite itself. During the Liturgy of the Eucharist, especially the Eucharistic Prayer, it is closest to other forms of the Roman Rite, while it differs more during the Liturgy of the Word and the Penitential Rite. The language used, which differs from that of the ICEL translation of the Roman Rite of Mass, is based upon the Book of Common Prayer, originally written in the 16th century. Prior to the establishment of the personal ordinariates, parishes in the United States were called "Anglican Use" and used the Book of Divine Worship, an adaptation of the Book of Common Prayer. The Book of Divine Worship has been replaced with the similar Divine Worship: The Missal for use in the ordinariates worldwide, replacing the official term "Anglican Use" with "Divine Worship".

Anglican liturgical rituals, whether those used in the ordinariates of the Catholic Church or in the various prayer books and missals of the Anglican Communion and other denominations, trace their origin back to the Sarum Use, which was a variation of the Roman Rite used in England before introduction during the reign of Edward VI of the 1549 Book of Common Prayer, following the break from the Roman church under the previous monarch Henry VIII.

In the United States, under a Pastoral Provision in 1980, personal parishes were established that introduced adapted Anglican traditions to the Catholic Church from members' former Episcopal parishes. That provision also permitted, as an exception and on a case-by-case basis, the ordination of married former Episcopal ministers as Catholic priests. As personal parishes, these parishes were formally part of the local Catholic diocese, but accepted as members any former Anglican who wished to make use of the provision.

On 9 November 2009, Pope Benedict XVI established a worldwide provision for Anglicans who joined the church. This process set up personal ordinariates for former Anglicans and other persons entering the full communion of the Catholic Church. These ordinariates would be similar to dioceses, but encompassing entire regions or nations. Parishes belonging to an ordinariate would not be part of the local diocese. These ordinariates are charged with maintaining the Anglican liturgical, spiritual and pastoral traditions, and they have full faculties to celebrate the Eucharist and the other sacraments, the Liturgy of the Hours and other liturgical functions in accordance with the liturgical books proper to the Anglican tradition, in revisions approved by the Holy See. This faculty does not exclude liturgical celebrations according to the Roman Rite.

The Personal Ordinariate of Our Lady of Walsingham was set up for England and Wales on 15 January 2011; the Personal Ordinariate of the Chair of Saint Peter for the United States and Canada on 1 January 2012; and the Personal Ordinariate of Our Lady of the Southern Cross for Australia on 15 June 2012. As of 2017 it was decreed that all parishes in the United States established under the Pastoral Provision be transferred to the Ordinariate. Bishop Steven Lopes of the Personal Ordinariate of the Chair of Saint Peter has requested that terms such as "Anglican Use" and "Anglican Ordinariate" be avoided, saying "Our clergy and faithful do not like being called Anglican, both because this is insensitive to actual Anglicans, and because it is a subtle way of suggesting that their entrance into full communion is less that total. We are Catholic in every sense."

Algonquian and Iroquoian Uses

Also called "Indian Masses", a number of variations on the Roman Rite developed in the Indian missions of Canada and the United States. These originated in the 17th century, and some remained in use until the Second Vatican Council. The priest's parts remained in Latin, while the ordinaries sung by the choir were translated into the vernacular (e.g., Mohawk, Algonquin, Micmac, and Huron). They also generally featured a reduced cycle of native-language propers and hymns.

Zaire Use

The Zaire Use is an inculturated variation of the Ordinary Form of the Roman Rite of the Roman Catholic Church. It has been used to a very limited extent in some African countries since the late 1970s to early 1980s.

Sarum Use 

The Use of Sarum is a variant on the Roman rite originating in the Diocese of Salisbury, which had come to be widely practised in England and Scotland until its suppression during the English Reformation and replaced by the Book of Common Prayer, which was heavily influenced by it in the then schismatic Church of England, and its usage among the remaining Catholics was gradually supplanted by the Tridentine Mass.

Western Rites of "Gallican" type

Ambrosian Rite

The Ambrosian Rite is celebrated most often in the Archdiocese of Milan, Italy, and in parts of some neighbouring dioceses in Italy and Switzerland. The language used is now usually Italian, rather than Latin. With some variant texts and minor differences in the order of readings, it is similar in form to the Roman Rite. Its classification as Gallican-related is disputed.

Rite of Braga

The Rite of Braga is used, but since 18 November 1971 only on an optional basis, in the Archdiocese of Braga in northern Portugal.

Mozarabic Rite

The Mozarabic Rite, which was prevalent throughout Spain in Visigothic times, is now celebrated only in limited locations, principally the cathedral of Toledo.

Carthusian Rite
The Carthusian rite is in use in a version revised in 1981. Apart from the new elements in this revision, it is substantially the rite of Grenoble in the 12th century, with some admixture from other sources. Among other differences from the Roman Order of Mass, the deacon prepares the gifts while the Epistle is being sung, the celebrating priest washes his hands twice at the offertory and says the eucharistic prayer with arms extended in the form of a cross except when using his hands for some specific action, and there is no blessing at the end of Mass.

Western Rite of sui generis type

Benedictine Rite

The Order of Saint Benedict has never had a rite of the Mass peculiar to it, but it keeps its very ancient Benedictine Rite of the Liturgy of the Hours.

Defunct Catholic Western liturgical rites

African Rite

In Africa Proconsulare, located in present-day Tunisia (of which Carthage was the capital), the African Rite was used before the 7th-century Arab conquest. It was very close to the Roman Rite – so much so that Western liturgical traditions have been classified as belonging to two streams, the North African-Rome tradition, and the Gallican (in the broad sense) tradition encompassing the rest of the Western Roman Empire, including northern Italy.

Celtic Rite 

The ancient Celtic Rite was a composite of non-Roman ritual structures (possibly Antiochian) and texts not exempt from Roman influence, that was similar to the Mozarabic Rite in many respects and would have been used at least in parts of Ireland, Scotland, the northern part of England and perhaps even Wales, Cornwall and Somerset, before being authoritatively replaced by the Roman Rite in the early Middle Ages. "Celtic" is possibly a misnomer and it may owe its origins to Augustine's re-evangelisation of the British Isles in the 6th century. Little is known of it, though several texts and liturgies survive. 

Some Christians – typically groups not in communion with the Roman Catholic Church, especially some Western Orthodox Christian communities in communion with Eastern Orthodox Churches, e.g. Celtic Orthodoxy – have attempted to breathe life into a reconstruction of the Celtic Rite, the historical accuracy of which is debated. Historical evidence of this rite is found in the remnants of the Stowe (Lorrha) Missal.

Gallican Rite

The Gallican Rite is a retrospective term applied to the sum of the local variants, on similar lines to that designated elsewhere as the Celtic Rite (above) and the Mozarabic Rite, which faded from use in France by the end of the first millennium. It should not be confused with the so-called Neo-Gallican liturgical books published in various French dioceses after the Council of Trent, which had little or nothing to do with it.

Regional Latin rites or uses
Several local rites of limited scope existed, but are now defunct. More properly these are uses or variants of the Roman Rite, most with Gallican elements, some with Byzantine liturgical and traditional elements.
The Lyonese Rite of the Diocese of Lyon, France, which some consider to have been (rather than Milan) the centre of diffusion of the Gallican liturgy; it is maintained in a few parishes in Lyon.
The Nidaros Use, long defunct, based mainly on imported English liturgical books, used in pre-Reformation Norway.
The Aquileian Rite, a defunct rite originating in the former patriarchate of Aquileia in northern Italy.
The Durham Rite (defunct: Durham, England)

Rites of religious orders

Some religious orders celebrated Mass according to rites of their own, dating from more than 200 years before the papal bull Quo primum. These rites were based on local usages and combined elements of the Roman and Gallican Rites. Following the Second Vatican Council, they have mostly been abandoned, except for the Carthusian Rite (see above). Religious orders of more recent origin have never had special rites.

The following previously existing rites of Mass, distinct from the Roman Rite, continue to be used on a limited basis by the permission of ecclesiastical superiors:
Carmelite Rite
Cistercian Rite
Dominican Rite
Premonstratensian or Norbertine Rite

The Catholic Encyclopedia applied the word "rite" also to the practices followed (to some extent even now, a century later) by certain Catholic religious orders, while at the same time stating that they in fact followed the Roman Rite:
Franciscan Rite
Friars Minor Capuchin Rite
Servite Rite

See also
Alexandrian Rite
Antiochene Rite
Armenian Rite 
Byzantine Rite
Catholic particular churches and liturgical rites
East Syriac Rite
General Roman Calendar
Western Rite Orthodoxy
West Syriac Rite

References

External links
Dom Fernand Cabrol's The Mass of the Western Rites
Non-Roman Latin or Western Rites
An African Interpretation of Liturgical Inculturation: The Rite Zairois
Usuarium, A Digital Library and Database for the Study of Latin Liturgical History in the Middle Ages and Early Modern Period

 
Western Christianity